Phalonidia zygota is a species of moth of the family Tortricidae. It is found in China (Beijing, Gansu, Hebei, Heilongjiang, Inner Mongolia, Jilin, Qinghai, Shandong, Tianjin), Japan, Korea, Mongolia and Russia.

The wingspan is 14–16 mm.

References

Moths described in 1964
Phalonidia